Charlesland is a townland and residential development located on the southside of Greystones in County Wicklow, Ireland. It is about 25 kilometres from Dublin city centre. As of the 2011 census, the townland of Charlesland had a population of 3,130 people.

Amenities
Charlesland has about 1,500 houses and apartments, a neighbourhood shopping complex, several pre-schools and a sports and recreation complex.

Located in the area is a private fitness centre consisting of a gym and swimming pool, and a large council facility including several outdoor 5-a-side pitches, tennis and basketball courts, and other facilities.

It is served by the 84X and 184 bus routes.

References

Townlands of County Wicklow